Martin H. Tankleff (born August 29, 1971) is an American man who was wrongly convicted of murdering his wealthy parents, Seymour and Arlene Tankleff, on September 7, 1988, when he was 17 years old. After serving more than 17 years of imprisonment, his conviction was vacated and he was released from prison in 2007. He is now an attorney.

Imprisonment 

Tankleff was admitted to the New York State Department of Correctional Services in October 1990. In state custody, Tankleff was incarcerated at the Clinton Correctional Facility in Dannemora, New York, in a special housing unit called "APPU" for high-profile inmates and inmates at high risk of victimization.

Trial, conviction and sentencing 
Tankleff was convicted of killing his parents, Seymour and Arlene Tankleff, on June 28, 1990, and sentenced to two consecutive terms of 25 years to life in prison. In December 1993, the divided New York Supreme Court, Appellate Division affirmed Tankleff's conviction.

In January 1997, federal district Judge Thomas Collier Platt Jr. denied Tankleff's petition for a writ of habeas corpus. In January 1998, that judgment was affirmed by the United States Court of Appeals for the Second Circuit, with Judge Guido Calabresi writing for the unanimous panel.

In an appeal 12 years later, his lawyers presented new evidence and witnesses.

Appeals and exoneration
His lawyers mounted appeals of his conviction. A 2003 appeal hearing presented new evidence from 20 witnesses. In December 2007, the New York Supreme Court, Appellate Division unanimously vacated Tankleff's conviction and sentence.

An appellate court ultimately overturned his conviction in 2008, after Tankleff had served 17 years in prison. Tankleff was represented by attorney Barry Pollack.

Before the Suffolk County District Attorney dropped the charges, New York Governor Eliot Spitzer appointed New York Attorney General Andrew Cuomo as special prosecutor in the case. From his staff, Cuomo selected Chief Trial Counsel Benjamin Rosenberg and veteran homicide prosecutor Thomas Schellhammer to re-investigate the case.

With the investigation completed, on June 16, 2008, Rosenberg said to Justice Doyle, "The issue in this case is not whether there is evidence, but whether there is sufficient evidence." Rosenberg announced: "The people move to dismiss the indictment." In the same motion, prosecutors announced they would not proceed against suspects identified by Tankleff's defense team, revealing that, "on balance, the defense theory does not appear to be supported by clear evidence."

On July 22, 2008, Justice Doyle concurred with the Attorney General's motion to dismiss. All charges facing Tankleff were dropped; he would not face retrial.

Suit and settlement
Tankleff filed a civil suit against the state for his wrongful conviction and emotional distress. On January 7, 2014, Tankleff was awarded $3.4 million from the state as settlement of the lawsuit. 
By that time, Tankleff was in his last semester of law school. He graduated from the Touro Law Center on May 25, 2014. In April 2017, he passed the New York State bar exam.

Federal case 
Tankleff and his attorneys appeared before the U.S. District Court, the Eastern District of New York in Central Islip, New York for a hearing on October 30, 2017. He sued Suffolk County, in addition to various people who were police and county employees at the time of his arrest and trial. Tankleff was represented by Barry Scheck of Innocence Project in Manhattan. In April 2018, Tankleff reached a settlement with Suffolk County for $10 million.

See also
List of unsolved deaths

References

External links 
 Martin Tankleff gets more than $3.3 million settlement from New York state
 New York State Investigation Commission
 Wrongfully convicted of murdering my parents (27 min.) from Outlook (radio programme) on the BBC World Service

1971 births
1988 murders in the United States
False confessions
Overturned convictions in the United States
Living people
People from Long Island
American people wrongfully convicted of murder
Place of birth missing (living people)
Police misconduct in the United States
Touro Law Center alumni
American lawyers